The Aubry–André model is a statistical toy model to study thermodynamic properties in condensed matter. The model is usually employed to study quasicrystals and the transition metal-insulator in disordered systems predicted by Anderson localization. It was first developed by Serge Aubry and Gilles André in 1980.

Tight–binding description 

Aubry–André model defines a periodic potential over a one-dimensional lattice with hopping between nearest neighbors sites with no interactions. In tight-binding, the on-site energies of Aubry-André potential have a periodicity that is incommensurate with the periodicity of the lattice. The potential can be written as
,
where the sum goes over all sites ,  is a Wannier state on lattice site   and the on-site energies are given by 
.

The full Hamiltonian can be written as

,

where  is the hopping constant. This Hamiltonian is self-dual as it retains the same form after a Fourier transformation.

For special values of  the system can demonstrate localization. For , the eigenmodes are extended plane waves. This limit between the two behaviors  is called the localization transition or the Aubry-André transition. For finite chains, the periodicity of the potential can also be chosen to be the ratio , with primes  and  larger than number of sites in the chain.

,

related to Harper equation that leads to a fractal spectrum known as the Hofstadter's butterfly, which describes the motion of an electron in a two-dimensional lattice under a magnetic field.

Realization 
IN 2009, Y. Lahini et al. presented one of the first experimental realizations of the Aubry-André model in photonic lattices.
Condensed matter physics

References